Maghazi is located in the Deir al-Balah Governorate in the central Gaza Strip. It is a Palestinian refugee camp that was established in 1949. According to the Palestinian Central Bureau of Statistics, the Refugee Camp had a population of 24,284 in mid-year 2006. The refugee camp is built on 559 dunums (0.6 km²).

In early 1949 Quaker aid workers visited Maghazi and reported that there were 2,500 refugees camped on privately owned land. They were living in Bedouin and Egyptian army tents as well the British army barracks. Most of the refugees had come from eight villages including Yasur, Qastina, Al-Batani al-Sharqi, Al-Batani al-Gharbi and Al-Maghar.

On the evening of Monday January 6, 2003, the IDF raided the camp and killed three Palestinians and wounded dozens claiming they were targeting militants hiding there.

Income 
Before the Gaza Strip's closure to Israel in 2000 following the Al-Aqsa Intifada, most residents had taken a number of various jobs in Israel or worked as farmers at local tells and pastures. There is a weekly souk, or open-air market, on Sunday in which residents buy or sell goods from their workshops, bakeries, cafes, diners and grocery lots.

Education 
Maghazi has three elementary schools and 2 junior high schools run by the UNRWA. 6,407 pupils had enrolled at these schools in the 2004-2005 year. In 1998, the UNRWA provided integrated educational services to 1,264 children with disabilities. There are a number of youth activities that involve in athletics, social and cultural programs.

Footnotes

External links
Maghazi  articles from  UNRWA
 Welcome To al-Maghazi R.C.

Populated places established in 1949
Palestinian refugee camps in the Gaza Strip
Deir al-Balah Governorate